An Upgrade or Upgrading is the process of replacing a product with a newer version of the same product.

Upgrade may also refer to:

 Upgrade (film), a 2018 cyberpunk action film
 Upgrade, Inc., American financial services company.
 Upgrade U, a song by American singer Beyoncé